Bahçe Wind Farm or Gökçedağ Wind Farm is an onshore wind power plant in the Bahçe district of Osmaniye Province, in the eastern Mediterranean Region of Turkey. Consisting of 54 wind turbines with an installed output power of 135 MW in total, the wind farm was the country's largest one when it was commissioned in 2009.

The licence for the wind farm was obtained in 2003 and will expire in 2033. Construction works at the site began in 2008. It was constructed on Gökçedağ, a mountain between Bahçe and Hasanbeyli, south of the Osmaniye-Gaziantep highway . It is operated by Rotor Co., a subsidiary of Zorlu Holding. The wind farm cost €200 million.

Technical details

Each of the 54 wind turbines of type GE 2.5 XL, manufactured by GE Wind Energy, has an installed power capacity of 2.5 MW generated by  rotor diameter at  hub height.

References 

Buildings and structures in Osmaniye Province
Wind farms in Turkey
Energy infrastructure completed in 2009
2009 establishments in Turkey
21st-century architecture in Turkey